Events from the year 1967 in Pakistan.

Incumbents

Federal government
President: Ayub Khan
Chief Justice: A.R. Cornelius

Events

July
 8 July, Pakistan mourns the death of the Mother of the Nation Miss Fatima Jinnah who died at the age of 74. There is a conspiracy theory that she was murdered by Ayub Khan's spies.

August
14 August, Pakistan celebrates its 20th year of independence.

Births
4 October – Aamer Hanif, cricketer.

See also
 1966 in Pakistan
 Other events of 1967
 1968 in Pakistan
 List of Pakistani films of 1967
 Timeline of Pakistani history

 
1967 in Asia